Dimitrios Roussis (born 6 May 1988) is a Greek professional football defender.

Career
Born in Agrinio, Roussis began playing football with his hometown club, Panetolikos in Gamma Ethniki.

References

External links
Profile at epae.org
Profile at Onsports.gr
Move To AEL 1964

1988 births
Living people
Greek footballers
Panetolikos F.C. players
Preveza F.C. players
Tilikratis F.C. players
Asteras Tripolis F.C. players
Athlitiki Enosi Larissa F.C. players
Kalamata F.C. players
Tsiklitiras Pylos F.C. players
Ethnikos Piraeus F.C. players
Association football defenders
Footballers from Agrinio